Mathildoidea is a superfamily of sea snails, marine gastropod mollusks in the informal group Lower Heterobranchia.

Families
Families within the superfamily Mathildoidea include:
Family Mathildidae
 † Family Ampezzanildidae
 † Family Anoptychiidae
 † Family Gordenellidae
 Family Tofanellidae
 † Family Trachoecidae

References 

 Jensen, R. H. (1997). A Checklist and Bibliography of the Marine Molluscs of Bermuda. Unp. , 547 pp
 Bouchet P., Rocroi J.P., Hausdorf B., Kaim A., Kano Y., Nützel A., Parkhaev P., Schrödl M. & Strong E.E. (2017). Revised classification, nomenclator and typification of gastropod and monoplacophoran families. Malacologia. 61(1-2): 1-526

Lower Heterobranchia